Kyiv Light Rail or Kyiv Express Tram (translit.: Kyivs’kyi shvydkisnyi tramvai) is a light rail rapid transit service that serves the Ukrainian capital Kyiv. The system is grade-separated from Kyiv's regular tram system.

There are two separate light rail lines which are not connected. A third line has been announced. Both extant lines have intermodal stations providing links with the Kyiv Metro, urban electric train, in addition to other modes of the city's public transport.

Lines

Pravoberezhna Line
The Pravoberezhna line is the first tram line to be opened, and is located on the city's right-bank. It was closed for reconstruction in 2008 and opened again on 16 October 2010. The line is separated from other street traffic by fence for most of its length.

Livoberezhna Line
The Livoberezhna line is the system's second light rail line that was built in 1993–2000 to serve the Troieschyna neighborhood. It was closed after low passenger traffic in 2009, although it was rebuilt to connect with the urban electric train in 2010–2012 and re-opened on 25 October 2012. The line is also entirely separated from other traffic with fence and bridges.

Gallery

References

External links
 
 
 

 
Light Rail
Tram transport in Ukraine
Railway lines opened in 1978
1978 establishments in Ukraine